Eric S Yuan (born 20 February 1970) is a Chinese-American billionaire businessman, engineer, and the chief executive officer and founder of Zoom Video Communications, of which he owns 22%.

Early life
Yuan is the son of geological engineers. He was born and raised in Tai'an, Shandong Province, China. In 4th grade, Yuan collected construction scraps to recycle copper for cash.

As a first-year university student in 1987, he was inspired to develop videotelephony software while he took 10-hour train rides to visit his girlfriend and was looking for an easier way to "visit" her. He earned a bachelor's degree in applied mathematics with a minor in computer application from Shandong University of Science and Technology, and a master's degree in geology engineering from China University of Mining and Technology in Beijing. Yuan completed a Stanford University executive program in 2006.

Career
After earning his master's degree, Yuan lived in Beijing, and attended a training program in Japan for four months. Inspired by Bill Gates, who spoke in Japan in 1995, he moved to Silicon Valley in 1997 to join the tech boom. At the time, Yuan spoke very little English, and applied nine times before being granted a visa to the United States.

Upon arriving in the US, Yuan joined WebEx, a web conferencing startup, where he was one of the first 20 hires. The company was acquired by Cisco Systems in 2007, at which time he became vice president of engineering. In 2011, Yuan pitched a new smartphone-friendly video conferencing system to Cisco management. When the idea was rejected, Yuan left Cisco to establish his own company, Zoom Video Communications.

In 2019, Zoom became a public company via an initial public offering, at which time Yuan became a billionaire. His wealth has increased during COVID-19 pandemic, as Zoom has benefited from the shift to online work and teaching. On September 1, 2020, Yuan's net worth was estimated to be US$16.4 billion, a figure 360% higher than his net worth at the beginning of the year. In March 2021, Yuan transferred $6 billion worth of Zoom shares to a grantor retained annuity trust, for which Yuan is a trustee.

Personal life
Yuan married his girlfriend Sherry at the age of 22, while he was a master's student at China University of Mining and Technology in Beijing. They have three children. Yuan and his family live in Santa Clara, California. In 2007, Yuan became a naturalized United States citizen.

Yuan chose the middle name "S" after Subrah Iyar, cofounder of WebEx.

Recognition
Yuan was named the 2020 Time Businessperson of the Year, and was included in the Time 100 Most Influential People of 2020.

References

1970 births
Businesspeople from Shandong
Chinese emigrants to the United States
Cisco people
Living people
Shandong University of Science and Technology alumni
China University of Mining and Technology alumni
Stanford University alumni
American billionaires
People from Santa Clara, California
People from Tai'an
American businesspeople